Chantel Taleen Jeffries  (born September 30, 1992), is an American DJ, model, and YouTube personality. She released her debut single, "Wait", on May 2, 2018, under Universal Music Group's record label 10:22pm. The song peaked at No. 10 on the Billboard Hot Dance/Electronic Songs chart.

Early life and education
Jeffries was born on September 30th, 1992, in Coronado, California. Her parents are Colonel Edward Jeffries and Kathleen Jeffries. She is of African-American, French, Cherokee, Irish and Italian descent. She grew up with her younger sister and brother in Jacksonville, North Carolina. Her father worked for a military training company and is a Marine Corps veteran. Her family was always on the road traveling from one place to another due to her father's work. Jeffries graduated from Massaponax High School in Virginia, and attended Florida International University where she studied Communication Arts and Fine Arts.

Music career

2018–present: Calculated Luck
Shortly after being signed to the Universal Music Group label 10:22 pm, it was announced that Jeffries would release her debut single on May 4, 2018. The track features American rappers Offset and Vory, who came by and heard the track and wanted to "lay some melodies." "Wait" was officially released on May 4, 2018. A vertical music video for the single was released on June 5, 2018. Jeffries released her second single, "Both Sides", on July 13, 2018, featuring Vory. A third single was released on August 10, 2018, called "Better". It featured American rapper BlocBoy JB and Vory. On February 1, 2019, Jeffries released her fourth single "Facts", which features American rappers YG, Rich the Kid, and BIA. A lyric video was released the same day.

Discography

Singles

References

Living people
Musicians from Los Angeles
Songwriters from California
American people of Irish descent
American people of French descent
American people of Italian descent
American people of Cherokee descent
American people of African descent
1992 births
People from Coronado, California
Women DJs